Malicious Intent may refer to:

 Malicious Intent (album)
 Malicious Intent (novel)
 Bad faith